The Guaymas Basin is a marginal rift basin, the largest such basin in the Gulf of California. It consists of two axial troughs (northern and southern).

The basin results from the activity of one of the several spreading centers in the Gulf. The basin is linked to the Carmen Fault to the south, and the Guaymas Fault to the north. 

The Guaymas seafloor has high heat flow, hydrothermal plumes, and hydrocarbon seeps.

Features

Northern trough

Southern trough

Biology 
Especially in the southern trough, the Guaymas Basin supports a unique and vibrant ecosystem. Heterotrophs consume organic matter rained down from the productive surface waters, while chemolithoautotrophs metabolize chemicals in the reduced hydrothermal fluid (often cycling these chemicals with syntrophic partners). Of note are the colonies of Riftia tubeworms, Beggiatoa and other microbial mats, and thermophilic microbes that can withstand hydrothermal temperatures (here up to __ °C).

References 

Geology of Mexico
Plate tectonics
Geography of Mexico
Depressions of Mexico